Gerhard Ebeling (1912–2001) was a German Lutheran theologian and with Ernst Fuchs a leading proponent of new hermeneutic theology in the 20th century.

Life
Ebeling was born on 6 July 1912 in Steglitz, Berlin, where he attended the gymnasium and began his university study. Ebeling was later a student of Rudolf Bultmann and Wilhelm Maurer in Marburg and of Emil Brunner at the University of Zürich, Switzerland. The years of his study in Berlin, Marburg, and Zürich fell in the period of Nazism in Germany, and his contact with Dietrich Bonhoeffer as well as his work in the Confessing Church had an enduring influence on his thought.

Already in this early work, Ebeling's interest in systematic as well as historical questions was very apparent. At the end of the Second World War, he completed in 1947 his habilitation at the University of Tübingen, Germany, and assumed the chair for ecclesiastical history in Tübingen. In 1954 Ebeling changed his focus of study from ecclesiastical history to systematic theology and became Professor of Systematic Theology in Tübingen. Two years later, he was called to the University of Zürich in systematic. With the exception of the period from 1965 to 1968, when he was once again in Tübingen, Ebeling remained in Zürich, where he was the founder and, until his retirement in 1979, the director of the Institute for Hermeneutics.

From 1950  Ebeling was the chief editor of the publication , and for several decades he presided over the Commission for the Publication of the Works of Martin Luther. Gerhard Ebeling held honorary doctorates from the universities of Bonn (1952), Uppsala (1970), St. Louis (1971), Edinburgh (1981), Neuchâtel (1993), and Tübingen (1997).

Ebeling's primary academic interests lay in the area of hermeneutics and the theology of Martin Luther, and both of these areas were combined in his focus on the proclamation of the gospel in the Christian Church. In connection with hermeneutics and the New Testament, he came in close contact with Ernst Fuchs, with whom he shared his interest in proclamation; in the early 1960s, Ebeling and Fuchs were guest lecturers at Claremont in Southern California where they presented their vision of a new hermeneutic (see James M. Robinson and John B. Cobb, Jr., eds., The New Hermeneutic, 1964). Both Ebeling and Fuchs stressed the character and power of language, the role of the Bible in the pulpit (Wesley O. Allen, Determining the Form, Structures for Preaching, 2008).

He died on 30 September 2001.

Works

 Evangelische Evangelienauslegung. Eine Untersuchung zu Luthers Hermeneutik. 1942 (= Ebelings Dissertation)
 Das Wesen des christlichen Glaubens. 1959
 Wort und Glaube, 4 vols. 1960–1995
 Wort Gottes und Tradition. Studien zu einer Hermeneutik der Konfessionen. 1964
 Luther. Einführung in sein Denken. 1964;  (Tb.)
 Lutherstudien, 3 Bände (in 5 Teilbänden). 1971–1989.
 Einführung in theologische Sprachlehre. 1971; 
 Dogmatik des christlichen Glaubens, 3 Bände. 1979, 4. edition 2012; 
 Predigten eines „Illegalen“ aus den Jahren 1939–1945. 1995; 
 Luthers Seelsorge. Theologie in der Vielfalt der Lebenssituationen an seinen Briefen dargestellt. 1997;

See also
 Kirchenkampf

Notes

References

Footnotes

Bibliography

 
 
 
 
 
 
 
 Pierre Bühler, Philipp Stoellger, Andreas Mauz (Red.): Gerhard Ebeling. Mein theologischer Weg, Zürich: Institut für Hermeneutik und Religionsphilosophie 2006 (Hermeneutische Blätter, Sonderheft 2006).
 Philipp Stoellger, Andreas Mauz (Red.): Gerhard Ebeling. Zürich: Institut für Hermeneutik und Religionsphilosophie 2003 (Hermeneutische Blätter, Sonderheft) Onlineressource (pdf; 988 kB)

1912 births
2001 deaths
20th-century German historians
20th-century German Protestant theologians
20th-century German Lutheran clergy
German historians of religion
German Lutheran theologians
Historians of Christianity
People from Steglitz-Zehlendorf
Systematic theologians